Squalus altipinnis, the western highfin spurdog, is a dogfish of the family Squalidae found on the continental shelf off Western Australia, at depths between 220 and 510 m. Its reproduction is ovoviviparous.

References

altipinnis
Fish of Australia
Fish described in 2007
Taxa named by Peter R. Last
Taxa named by William Toby White
Taxa named by John D. Stevens